Kinsmen Stadium is an outdoor baseball stadium in Oshawa, Ontario, Canada. It is located on the east side of Arena Street, south of the Children's Arena, west of the Oshawa Creek, and directly to the north of the former Hambly Arena site. It is the home Oshawa Legion Minor Baseball, Durham College Lords, and formerly the Oshawa Dodgers.

References

Baseball venues in Ontario
Minor league baseball venues
Sports venues in Oshawa